Orphan is a 2016 French drama film directed by Arnaud des Pallières and starring Adèle Haenel, Adèle Exarchopoulos, Solène Rigot and Vega Cuzytek. It was screened in the Special Presentations section at the 2016 Toronto International Film Festival.

Cast

 Adèle Haenel as Renée
 Adèle Exarchopoulos as Sandra
 Solène Rigot as Karine
 Vega Cuzytek as Kiki
 Jalil Lespert as Darius
 Gemma Arterton as Tara
 Nicolas Duvauchelle as Kiki's father
 Sergi López as Maurice
 Robert Hunger-Bühler as Lev
 Mehdi Meskar as Samy 
 Karim Leklou as Antonio
 Olivier Lousteau as François
 Rayan Rabia as Hakim
 Nina Mélo as Cindy
 Jonas Bloquet as Patrick
 Sarah Suco as The radiologist
 Karl Sarafidis as The gynecologist
 Jennifer Decker as Kiki's mother
 Sabine Pakora as The prison guard
 Émilie Gavois-Kahn

References

External links
 
 

2016 films
2016 drama films
2010s French-language films
French drama films
Films directed by Arnaud des Pallières
2010s French films